Rimoprogin is an antifungal compound.

References 

Antifungals
Alkyne derivatives
Pyrimidines
Thioethers